Nils Sjöberg may refer to:

 Nils Lorens Sjöberg  (1754–1822), Swedish officer and poet
 Nils Sjöberg, a pseudonym used by American singer-songwriter Taylor Swift (born 1989).